This is a list of representative leaders of BRICS states at each BRICS Summit since the group's inception in 2009.  The group consists of the five countries, Brazil, Russia, India, China and South Africa. BRICS holds an annual summit, which each state or government leader attends. Each year the heads of government take turns assuming the presidency, whose job it is to set the agenda for, and host, the annual summit.

The group was formed as BRIC, including all of today's members minus South Africa. South Africa joined in the third year of the group's existence, 2011, forming BRICS.

References

Notes 

Leaders
BRICS
BRICS